The 2016 Martyr's Memorial B-Division League season, also known as the RedBull Martyr's Memorial B-Division League for sponsorship reasons, was the 2016 edition of the second-tier club football competition in Nepal. The season began on 21 August 2016 and concluded on 5 October 2016. It was the first B division league held since 2014 due to the April 2015 Nepal earthquake. All matches were played at Halchowk Stadium and the ANFA Complex.

Teams

A total of 14 teams competed in the league, including 10 sides from the 2014 season, three relegated from the 2013-14 Martyr's Memorial A-Division League and one promoted from the 2014 Martyr's Memorial C-Division League.

Team Changes

To B-Division
Promoted from 2014 Martyr's Memorial C-Division League
 Khumaltar Youth Club
Relegated from 2013–14 Martyr's Memorial A-Division League
 Boys Union Club
 Ranipokhari Corner Team

From B-Division
Relegated to 2016 Martyr's Memorial C-Division League
 Birgunj Youth Association Football Club
 Boudha Football Club
 Swoyambhu Club
 United Youth Club
Promoted to 2018–19 Martyr's Memorial A-Division League
 Brigade Boys Club

Overview of teams

Venues
The league was played centrally in two venues in two cities in the Kathmandu Valley. Nepal's main football stadium, Dasharath Rangasala was unavailable, as it was not yet reconstructed following the 2015 Nepal earthquake.

League table

Awards

Controversy
On 27 September 2016, after losing against New Road Team, officials of Shree Kumari Club attacked and beat referee Sudesh Pandey. All Nepal Football Association sanctioned multiple of Shree Kumari Club's official, suspending the president of the club for two years.

Goal Nepal found out that the match commissioner of this game was not at the venue but in Goa, India, with a commentator calling this "disgusting". Citing security concerns, referees threatened to suspend operations after the incident.

References

Martyr's Memorial B-Division League seasons
2
Nepal